Jugon-les-Lacs (Gallo: Jugon) is a former commune in the Côtes-d'Armor department of Brittany in northwestern France. On 1 January 2016, it was merged into the new commune Jugon-les-Lacs-Commune-Nouvelle.

The Arguenon river flows through the commune.

Population

People from Jugon-les-Lacs are known in French as jugonnais.

See also
Communes of the Côtes-d'Armor department

References

External links

Former communes of Côtes-d'Armor